Brunei is a country in Southeast Asia, bordering the South China Sea and East Malaysia. It is larger in size than Trinidad and Tobago. It is close to vital sea lanes through the South China Sea linking the Indian and Pacific Oceans. The country has two parts physically separated by Malaysia, making it almost an enclave within Malaysia.

Brunei shares a  border with Malaysia and has a  coastline.

Physical Geography 
The terrain is a flat coastal plain that rises to mountainous in the east and hilly lowlands in the west. While earthquakes are quite rare, Brunei is located along the Pacific Ring of Fire.

Climate 

The climate in Brunei is tropical equatorial and humid subtropical at higher elevations with heavy rainfall. The municipality of Bandar Seri Begawan's climate is tropical equatorial with two seasons. Dry season is extremely hot. Wet or rainy season is generally warm and wet. Most of the country is a flat coastal plain with mountains in the east and hilly lowland in the west. The lowest point is at sea level and the highest is Bukit Pagon. Brunei also experiences typhoons and flooding.

Climatic regions 
Brunei-Muara District and Bandar Seri Begawan are humid tropical on the coast and lower elevation north and Humid subtropical in central Brunei-Muara District.
Tutong District is tropical, hot in the north and warm in the south.
Belait District is tropical, hot in the north and slightly warm in the south.
Temburong District is humid subtropical in the higher elevation south and humid tropical on the coast and lower elevation north.

Statistics 
Area:
Total: 
Land: 
Water: 

Maritime claims:
territorial sea:

exclusive economic zone:

Elevation extremes:
lowest point:
South China Sea 0 m
highest point:
Bukit Pagon 1,850 m

Natural resources:
petroleum, natural gas, timber

Land use:
arable land:
0.76%
permanent crops:
1.14%
other:
98.10% (2012)

Irrigated land:
 (2003)

Total renewable water resources:

Freshwater withdrawal (domestic/industrial/agricultural)
total:
0.09 km3/yr (97%/0%/3%)
per capital:
301.6 m3/yr (2009)

Environment – current issues:
seasonal smoke/haze resulting from forest fires in Indonesia

Environment – international agreements:
party to:
Biodiversity, Climate Change, Endangered Species, Hazardous Wastes, Law of the Sea, Ozone Layer Protection, Ship Pollution

References